In fluid dynamics, the pressure coefficient is a dimensionless number which describes the relative pressures throughout a flow field.  The pressure coefficient is used in aerodynamics and hydrodynamics.  Every point in a fluid flow field has its own unique pressure coefficient, .

In many situations in aerodynamics and hydrodynamics, the pressure coefficient at a point near a body is independent of body size.  Consequently, an engineering model can be tested in a wind tunnel or water tunnel, pressure coefficients can be determined at critical locations around the model, and these pressure coefficients can be used with confidence to predict the fluid pressure at those critical locations around a full-size aircraft or boat.

Definition
The pressure coefficient is a parameter for studying both incompressible/compressible fluids such as water and air.  The relationship between the dimensionless coefficient and the dimensional numbers is

where:
  is the static pressure at the point at which pressure coefficient is being evaluated
  is the static pressure in the freestream (i.e. remote from any disturbance)
  is the stagnation pressure in the freestream (i.e. remote from any disturbance)
  is the freestream fluid density (Air at sea level and 15 °C is 1.225 )
  is the freestream velocity of the fluid, or the velocity of the body through the fluid

Incompressible flow

Using Bernoulli's equation, the pressure coefficient can be further simplified for potential flows (inviscid, and steady):

For a case of an incompressible but viscous fluid, this represents the profile pressure coefficient, since it is associated with the pressure hydrodynamic forces rather than the viscous ones.

This relationship is valid for the flow of incompressible fluids where variations in speed and pressure are sufficiently small that variations in fluid density can be neglected. This is a reasonable assumption when the Mach number is less than about 0.3.

  of zero indicates the pressure is the same as the free stream pressure.
  of one corresponds to the stagnation pressure and indicates a stagnation point.
If this margin is positive, the flow is locally fully liquid, while if it is zero or negative the flow is cavitating or gas.

 of minus one is significant in the design of gliders because this indicates a perfect location for a "Total energy" port for supply of signal pressure to the Variometer, a special Vertical Speed Indicator which reacts to vertical movements of the atmosphere but does not react to vertical maneuvering of the glider.

In the fluid flow field around a body there will be points having positive pressure coefficients up to one, and negative pressure coefficients including coefficients less than minus one, but nowhere will the coefficient exceed plus one because the highest pressure that can be achieved is the stagnation pressure.

Compressible flow

In the flow of compressible fluids such as air, and particularly the high-speed flow of compressible fluids,  (the dynamic pressure) is no longer an accurate measure of the difference between stagnation pressure and static pressure.  Also, the familiar relationship that stagnation pressure is equal to total pressure does not always hold true.  (It is always true in isentropic flow but the presence of shock waves can cause the flow to depart from isentropic.)  As a result, pressure coefficients can be greater than one in compressible flow.

  greater than one indicates the freestream flow is compressible.

Perturbation theory 
The pressure coefficient   can be estimated for irrotational and isentropic flow by introducing the potential   and the perturbation potential , normalized by the free-stream velocity 

Using Bernoulli's equation,

which can be rewritten as

where  is the sound speed.

The pressure coefficient becomes

where  is the far-field sound speed.

Local piston theory 
The classical piston theory is a powerful aerodynamic tool. From the use of the momentum equation and the assumption of isentropic perturbations, one obtains the following basic piston theory formula for the surface pressure:

The surface is defined as

The slip velocity boundary condition leads to

The downwash speed  is approximated as

Pressure distribution 
An airfoil at a given angle of attack will have what is called a pressure distribution. This pressure distribution is simply the pressure at all points around an airfoil.

Relationship with aerodynamic coefficients
All the three aerodynamic coefficients are integrals of the pressure coefficient curve along the chord.
The coefficient of lift for a two-dimensional airfoil section with strictly horizontal surfaces can be calculated from the coefficient of pressure distribution by integration, or calculating the area between the lines on the distribution. This expression is not suitable for direct numeric integration using the panel method of lift approximation, as it does not take into account the direction of pressure-induced lift. This equation is true only for zero angle of attack.

where:

 is pressure coefficient on the lower surface
 is pressure coefficient on the upper surface
 is the leading edge location
 is the trailing edge location

When the lower surface  is higher (more negative) on the distribution it counts as a negative area as this will be producing down force rather than lift.

See also 
 Lift coefficient
 Drag coefficient
 Pitching moment coefficient

References

 Abbott, I.H. and Von Doenhoff, A.E. (1959) Theory of Wing Sections, Dover Publications, Inc. New York, Standard Book No. 486-60586-8
 Anderson, John D (2001) Fundamentals of Aerodynamic 3rd Edition, McGraw-Hill. 

Aerospace engineering
Dimensionless numbers of fluid mechanics
Fluid dynamics